"Wir beide" is a song by German band Juli. It was written by band members Jonas Pfetzing, and Eva Briegel for their second studio album Ein neuer Tag (2006), while production was overseen by O.L.A.F. Opal.

Charts

References

2006 singles
Juli (band) songs
2006 songs
Songs written by Eva Briegel
German-language songs